Nonel is a shock tube detonator designed to initiate explosions, generally for the purpose of demolition of buildings and for use in the blasting of rock in mines and quarries. Instead of electric wires, a hollow plastic tube delivers the firing impulse to the detonator, making it immune to most of the hazards associated with stray electric current. It consists of a small diameter, three-layer plastic tube coated on the innermost wall with a reactive explosive compound, which, when ignited, propagates a low energy signal, similar to a dust explosion. The reaction travels at approximately 2,000 m/s (6,500 ft/s)  along the length of the tubing with minimal disturbance outside of the tube.  The design of nonel detonators incorporates patented technology, including the Cushion Disk (CD) and Delay Ignition Buffer (DIB) to provide reliability and accuracy in all blasting applications.

Nonel was invented by the Swedish company Nitro Nobel in the 1960s and 1970s, under the leadership of Per-Anders Persson, and launched to the demolitions market in 1973. (Nitro Nobel became a part of Dyno Nobel after being sold to Norwegian Dyno Industrier AS in 1986.) Nonel is a contraction of "non electric".

References

Further reading
 Explosive videos
 An experimental study of temperature structure of shock relaxation in air-dusty explosive media

Demolition
Detonators
Explosives
Mining equipment
Swedish inventions